Tiyo Subregion is a subregion in the Southern Red Sea region (Zoba Debubawi Keyih Bahri) of Eritrea. Its capital lies at Tiyo.

References
Tiyo

Southern Red Sea Region
Subregions of Eritrea